Hunter McElrea (born 21 November 1999 in Los Angeles, California, United States) is a New Zealand racing driver currently competing in Indy NXT for Andretti Autosport.

Career

Karting
McElrea began his career in karting at the age of seven.

Formula Ford
In 2015, McElrea stepped up to single-seaters, competing in Formula Ford championships in both Australia and New Zealand, sometimes with the family outfit McElrea Racing. In 2018, McElrea contested a second full season of Australian Formula Ford with Sonic Motor Racing Services, accumulating thirteen wins and becoming the first non-Australian driver to win the title since 1985.

Road to Indy

USF2000 Championship
In December 2018, McElrea won the $200,000 Mazda Road to Indy Shootout at Wild Horse Pass Motorsports Park to compete in the 2019 U.S. F2000 National Championship. Joining with Pabst Racing, McElrea claimed four victories, including back-to-back wins at Portland and ultimately finished as championship runner-up after missing out on the title five points to Braden Eves.

Indy Pro 2000 
In October 2019, McElrea reunited with Pabst to partake in the Chris Griffis Memorial Test, setting the fastest time in the Indy Pro 2000 category. In March the following year, Pabst officially confirmed McElrea as one of its entrants into the 2020 championship. His rookie season in Indy Pro 2000 netted him 5th position in championship, with six podiums and a win at the final race of the year at the Grand Prix of St. Petersburg. McElrea again signed for Pabst Racing, for the 2021 season. McElrea won races at Barber Motorsports Park, Mid-Ohio Sports Car Course and New Jersey Motorsports Park on his way to 3rd in the championship. He also claimed seven podiums and a season leading five pole positions.

Indy Lights 
McElrea signed with Andretti Autosport, for the 2022 Indy Lights season. He scored pole position on debut at the Grand Prix of St. Petersburg. In 2022 McElrea achieved three pole positions, two race wins at Mid-Ohio Sports Car Course and Iowa Speedway, and claimed 'Rookie of the Year' honours. On September 3rd, Andretti Autosport announced that McElrea would join them again for the 2023 season.

Personal life
McElrea is the third generation in his motor racing family. His grandfather Rod McElrea won the New Zealand Beach Racing championships, in Nelson, in 1971 and the OSCA championships in 1983. His father Andy McElrea won the 1991 New Zealand Formula Ford Championship, and the 1996 New Zealand Trans-Am Championship. Andy is also the Founder & Team Principal of McElrea Racing, which competes in the Porsche Carrera Cup Australia Championship & Porsche Sprint Challenge Australia championships.

Racing record

Career summary

* Season still in progress.

Motorsports career results

American open–wheel racing results

U.S. F2000 National Championship

Indy Pro 2000 Championship

Indy Lights/Indy NXT
(key) (Races in bold indicate pole position) (Races in italics indicate fastest lap) (Races with L indicate a race lap led) (Races with * indicate most race laps led)

* Season still in progress.

References

External links
  
 
  

1999 births
Living people
Racing drivers from California
New Zealand racing drivers
Formula Ford drivers
U.S. F2000 National Championship drivers
Indy Lights drivers

Indy Pro 2000 Championship drivers
Andretti Autosport drivers